This is a list of the 63 members of the Icelandic Parliament (Althing), from 2009 till 2013.

Election results

Evolution of seat composition:

List of chosen MPs

Changes during the legislation

Members who changed parties

References

Lists of Members of the Althing